Fir'im was a Palestinian Arab village in the Safad Subdistrict that was depopulated during the 1948 Palestine war. It was first attacked during the 1947–1948 Civil War in Mandatory Palestine on May 2, 1948, by the Palmach's First Battalion during Operation Yiftach.  In 1945 the population had been 740.

Location
It was situated on the southeastern slope of Mount Kan'an, and overlooked land between Lake Tiberias and Lake Hula.

History
An archaeological site near Fir'im contained the ruins of buildings and rock-hewn tombs. In the late 19th century, remains of ancient structures built into the modern buildings were observed.

Ottoman era
According to the Ottomans 1596 tax records,  Fir'im belonged  to the nahiya (subdistrict)  of Jira, (in the  Safad Sanjak), and had a 72 households and 9 bachelors, an estimated population of 446, all Muslim. The villagers paid a fixed tax rate of 25% on various agricultural product, such as  wheat, barley, olives, goats, beehives, and a press that was used for processing either olives or grapes; total of 6,222 akçe. According to HaReuveni, Jews also lived in Fir'im in the 16th century, and the son of Rabbi Yom Tov Tzahalon died there. 

The village appeared under the name of Farhan on the map that Pierre Jacotin compiled during Napoleon's invasion of 1799.

In 1875 Victor Guérin noted that the village contained about twenty houses.
The villagers, who were Muslim, numbered about 200 and cultivated olives and figs.

A population list from about 1887 showed  Fe'ram to have  about 765 Muslim  inhabitants.

British Mandate era
In the 1922 census of Palestine conducted by the British Mandate authorities, Fer'em  had a population of 449; all Muslims,  increasing in the 1931 census to 527, still all  Muslims,  in  a total of 109  houses.

Most of the stone houses in the village were densely situated in a northwest—southeast order. The village had a village council, and an elementary school for boys.  The village economy was based on agriculture; fruit was the main crop, followed by grain. The village also had two olive presses. 

In  the  1945 statistics  the population was 740 Muslims, and the total land area was 2,023 dunums.  Of this,  was allocated to cereal farming, while  were used for plantations or were irrigated.

1948, and aftermath
The village was attacked by  forces  from the Jewish paramilitary organization Haganah on the night of 2 May 1948. The attack, called Operation Yiftach, was led by Yigal Allon.  In the operation, the villages of 'Ein al Zeitun and Biriyya were conquered, while the villages of Fir'im, Qabba'a and Mughr al-Khayt were intimidated with mortar barrages, which precipitated mass evacuation. However, the villagers soon began to return, only to find that Fir'im was torched by Palmach forces on 22 May. During late May it was reported that hungry refugees once again began to drift back to their old villages, including Fir'im. Mainly the villagers tried to harvest their crops, and many erected temporary shelters outside their old villages from where they could reach their crops and were relatively inaccessible to Israeli troops. The Haganah acted to curb this, and on 24 May, they started the "systematic torching of the villages of the Hula [Valley]."

By late June 1948, Israeli military intelligence reported (somewhat inaccurately, according to Morris), that "All the Arab villages in the Safad area as far [northwestward] as Sasa were empty".

Today the settlement of Hatzor HaGlilit (Chatzor ha-Gelilit), established in 1953, is situated about 1 kilometer southeast of where the village stood.

The Palestinian Historian Walid Khalidi described the village site in 1992: "The rubble of destroyed village houses is scattered across the site. Some terraces with olive trees remain. Olive trees and cactuses grow on the site and the surrounding lands. Some small portions of these lands are wooded but most are used for pasture."

See also
Ein al-Zeitun massacre

References

Bibliography

External links
Welcome To Fir'im
 Fir'im, Zochrot
Fir'im, Dr. Khalil Rizk.
Survey of Western Palestine, Map 4: IAA, Wikimedia commons
Fir'im, at Khalil Sakakini Cultural Center

Arab villages depopulated during the 1948 Arab–Israeli War
District of Safad